Toyota Motor Manufacturing Alabama (TMMAL) manufactures engines for cars and trucks near Huntsville, Alabama, United States. It is a subsidiary of Toyota Motor North America, itself a subsidiary of Toyota Motor Corporation of Japan. Construction of the factory was completed in 2003.

Engines produced
 A25A-FXS I4 (2018–present) for Highlander and Sienna
 M20A-FKS I4 (2018–present) for Corolla, Corolla Cross, and RAV4
 V35A-FTS twin-turbo V6 (2021–present) for Sequoia and Tundra
 2GR-FKS V6 (2016-present) for Tacoma
 2TR-FE I4 (2005-present) for Tacoma

Former production
 1GR-FE V6 (2005–2015) for Tacoma
 2GR-FE V6 (2013–2019) for Highlander
 1UR-FE V8 (2008–2019) for Tundra and Sequoia
 3UR-FE V8 (2007–2021) for Tundra and Sequoia
 AR engine I4 (2011–2019) for various models

References

External links
 Ward's article

Industrial buildings completed in 2003
Motor vehicle engine manufacturers
Buildings and structures in Madison County, Alabama
Toyota factories
Motor vehicle assembly plants in Alabama
Companies based in Huntsville, Alabama
Engine manufacturers of the United States